Lieutenant-General Sir Robert Grice Sturges  (14 July 1891 – 12 September 1970) was a senior Royal Marines officer who fought in both the First World War and Second World War.

Military career
Sturges joined the Royal Navy in 1908. Commissioned a sub-lieutenant on 15 May 1912, he transferred to the Royal Marines as a lieutenant from the same date (confirmed on 19 December 1914). He served in the First World War, seeing action in the Gallipoli campaign and the Battle of Jutland, and receiving promotion to captain on 30 January 1917. He was officially transferred to the Royal Marine Light Infantry on 30 January 1917.

Between the wars, he was promoted to major on 17 June 1929, and to lieutenant colonel on 1 April 1936. He was brevetted colonel and promoted to colonel on 3 April 1939 (seniority 31 December 1938).

During the Second World War he was the commander of the British occupation of Iceland in May 1940. He was promoted to acting colonel commandant and temporary brigadier on 4 June, and was mentioned in despatches in July. He was Commander of the British occupation of Madagascar in 1942. He went on to be Commander of the Special Service Group (Commandos) in 1943. He was described as "intrepid in action, ruddy in countenance, and forcefully bucolic in language". He retired in 1946.

References
Notes

Sources
 Survey of the Papers of Senior UK Defence Personnel, 1900–1975. Liddell Hart Centre for Military Archives.
 Lockhart, R. H. Bruce (1950). The Marines Were There: The Story of the Royal Marines in the Second World War. Putnam, London.
 Whitehead, Þór (1995). Milli vonar og ótta: Ísland í síðari heimsstyrjöld. Vaka-Helgafell, Reykjavík. .

External links
Generals of World War II
Royal Marine Officers 1939−1945

Royal Marines generals of World War II
History of Madagascar
1891 births
1970 deaths
Royal Marines personnel of World War I
Knights Commander of the Order of the British Empire
Companions of the Order of the Bath
Companions of the Distinguished Service Order
Royal Marines Commando officers
People from the Borough of Wokingham
Royal Marines generals
Gallipoli campaign
Military personnel from Berkshire